is the second daughter of the Crown Prince and Crown Princess of Japan and a member of the Japanese imperial family. She is a niece of Emperor Naruhito and the second-eldest grandchild of Emperor Emeritus Akihito and Empress Emerita Michiko.

Biography
Princess Kako was born on 29 December 1994 at Imperial Household Agency Hospital in Tokyo Imperial Palace, Chiyoda, Tokyo.
In April 2001, Princess Kako began Gakushuin Primary School and graduated in March 2007. Princess Kako entered Gakushuin Girls' Senior High School Tokyo in April 2007 and graduated in March 2013. 

From 7 to 21 August 2003, Kako went to Thailand with her parents and sister for the 71st birthday celebration of Queen Sirikit and for conferment of an honorary fellowship from Ubon Ratchathani University, and for joint research on poultry.

She has an older sister, Mako Komuro, and a younger brother, Prince Hisahito.

Kako participated in figure skating while in primary school. In 2007, she represented the Meiji-jingu Gaien Figure Skating Club and joined the Spring Cup Figure Skating Competition held by the Japan Skating Federation. Princess Kako ranked top in the Shinjuku division (Female Group B - Primary School Year Six or above).

In April 2013, she attended the entrance ceremony of Gakushuin University and began her life as an undergraduate student. In August 2014, she quit the Department of Education, the Faculty of Letters, Gakushuin University and passed the entrance examination to the International Christian University (ICU), her older sister's alma mater. On 2 April 2015, the Princess attended the entrance ceremony of the university in Tokyo.

In 2017, as part of the ICU's study abroad programme, Princess Kako travelled to the United Kingdom to study at the University of Leeds. She studied performing arts and psychology as part of the programme. She completed her studies in June 2018.

In September 2019, she embarked on her first official solo overseas visit and went to Austria and Hungary, where she met with the heads of state of those countries. In May 2021, she began working part-time for the Japanese Federation of the Deaf.

Titles and styles

Kako is styled as Her Imperial Highness Princess Kako.

Honours

National honours
:
 Grand Cordon of the Order of the Precious Crown (29 December 2014)

References

External links

1994 births
Living people
Grand Cordons (Imperial Family) of the Order of the Precious Crown
International Christian University alumni
Japanese princesses
People from Tokyo
20th-century Japanese women
21st-century Japanese women